Something Like a Storm is the eighth solo album by Matthew Good. The first song released from the album was "Bad Guys Win", which was released on April 21, 2017, with an accompanying music video. On July 14, Good released the lead single off the album, "Decades", which was accompanied by a music video. The album was released on October 20, 2017.

Track listing

Charts

References

2017 albums
Matthew Good albums
Albums produced by Warne Livesey